The Indigenous Peoples Council on Biocolonialism (IPCB) is a non-profit organization based in Nixon, Nevada for the purpose of political activism against the emergent field of population genetics for human migration research. The term "biocolonialism" is a neologism —a portmanteau of "bio-" and "colonialism" —used by the IPCB to pejoratively characterise population genetics research as part of invasive and destructive assimilation against indigenous peoples.

The group claims to advocate for the interests of indigenous peoples, to assist "in the protection of their genetic resources, indigenous knowledge, cultural and human rights from the negative effects of biotechnology." In particular, the IPCB's protests were based on a rejection of participating in scientific research that would negate or otherwise contradict traditional Native American accounts and narratives about their ancestral origins, and lend support to other alternate views.

IPCB was a signatory of the Indigenous Peoples' Seattle Declaration in 1999.

History

The IPCB was founded in 1999 by the current Executive Director Debra Harry, following her growing concerns over a perceived impact of genetic colonialism on the lives of indigenous peoples. The organization objects to genetic variation research on isolated populations, as well as its prospective commercial exploration; claiming it as a global threat, not only to the self-determination of all indigenous peoples, but also to the non-indigenous world and to the earth itself.

In 2005 and 2006, the group protested against the National Geographic's Genographic Project (cf. criticism).

See also
 Convention on Biological Diversity
 George Annas, a director of IPCB
 Jonathan Marks, a director of IPCB
 Stuart Newman, a director of IPCB

References

Further reading
 Chris Richards, Interview with Debra Harry and the Indigenous Peoples Council on Biocolonialism, New Internationalist,  December 2005 accessed at  August 4, 2006
  Statements by organizations representing indigenous and local communities, on Convention on Biological Diversity website, accessed at  August 4, 2006

External links
 IPCB - Official website

Bioethics
Native American organizations
Non-profit organizations based in Nevada
Politics of science
Traditional knowledge